Bárbara Allende Gil de Biedma (29 June 1957 – 24 May 2022), also known as Ouka Leele, was a Spanish photographer.

Life and career 
Bárbara Allende Gil de Biedma was born in Madrid on 29 June 1957 to a well-off family belonging to the Bilbao's bourgeoisie. Her uncle Jaime Gil de Biedma was a famous poet; and her cousin Esperanza Aguirre served as the President of the Community of Madrid from 2003 to 2012. She picked up the alias of Ouka Leele after the name of a fictional star created by El Hortelano.

She was one of the most important photographers during La Movida Madrileña and she also worked as an illustrator and wrote several poetry books.

She was a member of the Agence VU.

In the wake of the COVID-19 pandemic, she participated in 2020 in an anti-mask stunt organised by Rafael Palacios, and claimed that "the best mask is love".

She died on 24 May 2022.

Awards

 Premio Nacional de Fotografía, Ministry of Culture, 2005
 Premio de Cultura de la Comunidad de Madrid, 2003 (photography)
 Premio Ícaro de Artes Plásticas, Diario 16, 1983.

Collections (partial) 

 Centre of Vieille Charité, Marseille
 Photography Andalusian Centre
 Collection Arco, Madrid
 Foundation Cartier, Paris
 Foundation La Caixa, Barcelona
 Cervantes Institute, Lisbon
 Museo Nacional Centro de Arte Reina Sofía. Madrid
 Tabaco Gitanes, Paris.

See also 

 Movida Madrileña
 El Hortelano

Publications 

 Poesía en carne viva (Ediciones Atlantis, 2006)
 Ouka Leele. El nombre de una estrella (Ellago Ediciones, 2006)
 Ouka Leele inédita (tf. editores, 2008).

References

Sources 

 Álvarez, J. D. Esa luz cuando justo da el sol. Biografía de Ouka Leele (Neverland Ediciones, 2006).

External links 
  Biography.

1957 births
2022 deaths
20th-century Spanish women artists
Spanish photographers
Artists from Madrid
Feminist artists
Spanish contemporary artists
Spanish women photographers